William John Churchyard (2 February 1878 – 31 August 1957) was an Australian rules footballer who played with Carlton in the Victorian Football League (VFL).

Notes

External links 
		
Bill Churchyard's profile at Blueseum

1878 births
1957 deaths
Australian rules footballers from Melbourne
Carlton Football Club players
People from Carlton, Victoria